The Braemar Avenue Baptist Church is a grade II listed baptist church in Braemar Avenue, Wood Green, London.

References

External links 

Baptist churches in London
Churches in the London Borough of Haringey
Grade II listed churches in London
Wood Green
Bounds Green Road